Pyroglutamyl-histidyl-glycine (pEHG) is an endogenous tripeptide that acts as a tissue-specific antimitotic and selectively inhibits the proliferation of colon epithelial cells. Early research indicated that pEHG had anorectic effects in mice and was possibly involved in the pathophysiology of anorexia nervosa. However, subsequent studies have found that pEHG lacks anorectic effects and does not alter food intake in mice.

References 

Tripeptides